Trinity is an American family drama television series created by Matthew Carnahan that aired on the broadcast network NBC from October 16, 1998 to November 6, 1998. Only four of the first season's 9 episodes were aired before the series was cancelled by NBC in March 1999. Among the main cast was Louis Ferreira, Jill Clayburgh, Tate Donovan, and Sam Trammell.

Plot
Set in Hell's Kitchen, Manhattan, a detective from a working-class Irish Catholic family looks after his family members.

Cast
 Louis Ferreira as Bobby McCallister
 Jill Clayburgh as Eileen McCallister
 John Spencer as Simon McCallister
 Tate Donovan as Kevin McCallister
 Sam Trammell as Liam McCallister
 Kim Raver as Clarissa McCallister
 Bonnie Root as Amanda McCallister
 Charlotte Ross as Fiona McCallister

Episodes

Awards and nominations

References

External links
 

1990s American drama television series
1998 American television series debuts
1998 American television series endings
English-language television shows
NBC original programming
Television series by Warner Bros. Television Studios
Television shows set in New York City